Robert Ludlow "Bob" Trivers (born February 19, 1943) is an American evolutionary biologist and sociobiologist. Trivers proposed the theories of reciprocal altruism (1971), parental investment (1972), facultative sex ratio determination (1973), and parent–offspring conflict (1974).  He has also contributed by explaining self-deception as an adaptive evolutionary strategy (first described in 1976) and discussing intragenomic conflict.

Education
Trivers studied evolutionary theory with Ernst Mayr and William Drury at Harvard from 1968 to 1972, when he earned his PhD in biology. At Harvard he published a series of some of the most influential and highly cited papers in evolutionary biology. His first major paper as a graduate student was "The evolution of reciprocal altruism", published in 1971. In this paper Trivers offers a solution to the longstanding problem of cooperation among unrelated individuals and by doing so overcame a crucial problem for how to police the system by proposing ways that the process of natural selection could evolve ways to detect cheaters. His next major work, "Parental investment and sexual selection", was published the following year. Here Trivers proposed a general framework for understanding sexual selection that had eluded evolutionary thinkers since Charles Darwin. Arguably his most important paper, it arose from watching male and female pigeons out the window of his third floor apartment in Cambridge, Massachusetts, and by his reading a 1948 paper by Angus Bateman (“Intra-sexual selection in Drosophila”) which demonstrated that sex differences in the intensity of selection in fruit flies were based on their ability to obtain mates. The primary insight of Trivers was that the key variable underlying the evolution of sex differences across species was relative parental investment in offspring.

Career and research
Trivers was on the faculty at Harvard University from 1973 to 1978, and then moved to the University of California, Santa Cruz where he was a faculty member 1978 to 1994. He is currently a Rutgers University notable faculty member. In the 2008–09 academic year, he was a Fellow at the Berlin Institute for Advanced Study.

Trivers was awarded the 2007 Crafoord Prize in Biosciences for "his fundamental analysis of social evolution, conflict and cooperation".

Trivers met Huey P. Newton, Chairman of the Black Panther Party, in 1978 when Newton applied while in prison to do a reading course with Trivers as part of a graduate degree in History of Consciousness at UC Santa Cruz. Trivers and Newton became close friends: Newton was godfather to one of Trivers's daughters. Trivers joined the Black Panther Party in 1979. Trivers and Newton published an analysis of the role of self-deception by the flight crew in the crash of Air Florida Flight 90. Trivers was "ex-communicated" from the Panthers by Newton in 1982 for "his own good."

Trivers wrote the original foreword to Richard Dawkins' book The Selfish Gene, in which Trivers first proposed his adaptive theory of self-deception.  In the 2006 anniversary edition of The Selfish Gene, Dawkins wrote a new introduction in which he stated This edition does, however—and it is a source of particular joy to me—restore the original Foreword by Robert Trivers. I have mentioned Bill Hamilton as one of the four intellectual heroes of the book. Bob Trivers is another. His ideas dominate large parts of Chapters 9, 10 and 12, and the whole of Chapter 8. Not only is his Foreword a beautifully crafted introduction to the book: unusually, he chose the medium to announce to the world a brilliant new idea, his theory of the evolution of self-deception. I am most grateful to him for giving permission for the original Foreword to grace this Anniversary Edition.

Suspension 
In 2015, Rutgers University suspended Trivers with pay as part of an ongoing dispute regarding a class on "Human Aggression" the Anthropology department had assigned to him. Trivers said that he was told to teach the class even though he objected that he knew nothing about the specific subject. In his first lecture, Trivers told the class he would do his best to learn the subject along with them and with the help of guest lecturers. Rutgers suspended Trivers for involving the students in the controversy. Trivers told the Rutgers campus newsletter that Rutgers's officials refused to meet with him. Trivers also told the student paper: "You would think the university would show a little respect for my teaching abilities on subjects that I know about and not force me to teach a course on a subject that I do not at all master." Trivers has had a contentious few years at Rutgers.

Influence
Trivers is among the most influential evolutionary theorists alive today. Steven Pinker considers Trivers to be "one of the great thinkers in the history of Western thought", who has:
...inspired an astonishing amount of research and commentary in psychology and biology—the fields of sociobiology, evolutionary psychology, Darwinian social science, and behavioral ecology are in large part attempt to test and flesh out Trivers's ideas. It is no coincidence that E. O. Wilson's Sociobiology and Richard Dawkins' The Selfish Gene were published in 1975 and 1976 respectively, just a few years after Trivers's seminal papers. Both bestselling authors openly acknowledged that they were popularizing Trivers's ideas and the research they spawned. Likewise for the much-talked-about books on evolutionary psychology in the 1990s—The Adapted Mind, The Red Queen, Born to Rebel, The Origins of Virtue, The Moral Animal, and my own How the Mind Works. Each of these books is based in large part on Trivers's ideas and the explosion of research they inspired, involving dozens of animal species, mathematical and computer modeling, and human social and cognitive psychology.

Significant papers
 
 Trivers, R. L. (1972) Parental investment and sexual selection. In B. Campbell (Ed.) Sexual selection and the descent of man, 1871-1971 (pp 136–179). Chicago, Aldine.
 
 
 
 Trivers, R. L. (1991) Deceit and self-deception: The relationship between communication and consciousness. In: M. Robinson and L. Tiger (eds.) Man and Beast Revisited, Smithsonian, Washington, DC, pp. 175–191.

Books
 Trivers, R. L. (1985) Social Evolution. Benjamin/Cummings, Menlo Park, CA.
 Trivers, R. L. (2002) Natural Selection and Social Theory: Selected Papers of Robert L. Trivers. (Evolution and Cognition Series) Oxford University Press, Oxford. 
 Burt, A. & Trivers, R. L. (2006) Genes in Conflict : The Biology of Selfish Genetic Elements. Belknap Press, Harvard. 
 Trivers R, Palestis BG, Zaatari D. (2009) The Anatomy of a Fraud: Symmetry and Dance TPZ Publishers 
 Trivers R (2011) The Folly of Fools: The Logic of Deceit and Self-Deception in Human Life Basic Books 
 Trivers R (2015) Wild Life:  Adventures of an Evolutionary Biologist. Plympton.

Views 
Trivers believes that girls mature earlier than in the past. He writes “By the time they’re 14 or 15, they’re like grown women were 60 years ago".

References

1943 births
Living people
Evolutionary biologists
Evolutionary psychologists
Human evolution theorists
Harvard University alumni
Harvard University faculty
University of California, Santa Cruz faculty
Rutgers University faculty
Fellows of the American Association for the Advancement of Science
Members of the Black Panther Party
Activists from California
Sociobiologists